Ludwig Samson Heinrich Arthur Freiherr von und zu der Tann-Rathsamhausen (18 June 181526 April 1881) was a Bavarian general.

Early life
Born in Darmstadt, on the day of Waterloo, Ludwig was a descendant from the old family of von der Tann, which had branches in Bavaria, the Alsace and the Rhine provinces, and attached his mother's name (she being the daughter of an Alsatian nobleman, Freiherr von Rathsamhausen) to his father's in 1868 by license of the king of Bavaria. Ludwig I, the second king of Bavaria, stood sponsor for the child, who received his name and also "Arthur", in honour of Arthur Wellesley, 1st Duke of Wellington. He received a careful education, and in 1827 became a page at the Bavarian court, where a great future was predicted for him.

Military career
Von der Tann entered the military under the artillery branch in 1833, and was after some years placed on the general staff. He attended the manoeuvres of the Austrian army in Italy under Field Marshal Radetzky and, in a spirit of adventure, joined a French military expedition operating in Algiers against the Tunisian frontier.

First Schleswig War
On his return he became a close personal friend of the Bavarian Crown Prince Maximilian (afterwards King Maximilian II). In 1848 he was promoted to major, and in that year he distinguished himself greatly as the leader of a Schleswig-Holstein light corps in the First Schleswig War between Denmark and a coalition of German states. At the close of the first campaign he was awarded the Order of the Red Eagle by the king of Prussia, and his own sovereign awarded him the Military Order of Max Joseph and promoted him to lieutenant-colonel. In 1849 he served as chief of staff to the Bavarian contingent at the front and distinguished himself at the lines of Dybbøl.  He then visited Haynau's headquarters in the Hungarian War before returning to Schleswig-Holstein to serve as von Willisen's chief of staff in the Idstedt campaign.

Austro-Prussian War
Then came the threat of war between Prussia and Austria, and von der Tann was recalled to Bavaria. The crisis ended with the surrender of Olmütz (November 1850), and he saw no further active service until 1866, rising in the usual way of promotion to colonel (1851), major-general (1855), and lieutenant-general (1861). In the earlier years of this period he was the aide-de-camp and constant companion of King Maximilian. In the Austro-Prussian War of 1866 he served as chief of staff to Prince Karl Theodor of Bavaria, who commanded the South German contingents. The almost entirely unfavorable outcome of the military operations led to vehement attacks on him in the press, but the unreadiness and ineffectiveness of the troops and the general lack of interest in the war on the part of the soldiers had foredoomed the South Germans to failure in any case.

Franco-Prussian War
He continued to enjoy the favour of the king and was promoted to the rank of general of the infantry (1869), but the bitterness of his disappointment of 1866 never left him. He was grey-haired at forty-two, and his health was impaired. In 1869 von der Tann-Rathsamhausen, as he was now called, was appointed commander of the I. Bavarian Corps. This corps he commanded during the Franco-Prussian War of 1870/71, and it was in this war that he secured his reputation as one of the foremost of German soldiers. His gallantry was conspicuous at the battles of Wörth and Sedan. Transferred in the autumn to an independent command on the Loire, he conducted the operations against d'Aurelle de Paladines, at first with marked success, and forced the surrender of Orléans. He had, however, at Coulmiers to give way before a numerically larger French force; but reinforced, he fought several successful engagements under the Grand Duke of Mecklenburg-Schwerin near Orléans.

After the end of the war he was reappointed commander-in-chief of the I. Bavarian Corps, a post which he held until his death in 1881 at Meran. He received the Grand Cross of the Bavarian Military Order, and from the King of Prussia the first class of the Iron Cross and the Pour le Mérite. In 1878 the German emperor named von der Tann honorary colonel of a Prussian infantry regiment, gave him a life pension, and named one of the new Strassburg forts after him.

Honours and awards
Commemoration
A gunboat of the Schleswig-Holstein navy, Von der Tann, named after him in 1849.
The German World War I battlecruiser SMS Von der Tann was named after him.
The 11th Royal Bavarian Infantry Regiment (part of the 6th Royal Bavarian Division formed in 1900 in Regensburg) was designated "Von der Tann" in his honor.
 Naming of "Fort Tann" Fort No. 8 at Strasbourg by Kaiser Wilhelm I (1873)
 Honorary Citizen of the City of Munich (1871)
 Monument on Marktplatz von Tann (Rhön) (1900)
 Naming of Von-der-Tann-Straße in Erlangen (1900), Munich, Dortmund, Wuppertal (1901), Hamburg, Nuremberg, Neustadt and Regensburg (1901)
 Composer Andreas Hager wrote in 1880 in his homage to "General von der Thann march", as the parade of his regiment (Royal Bav. 11th Infantry Regiment "Von der Thann") has been assigned.

Orders and decorations

Military appointments
 Presentation à la suite of the 1st Field Artillery Regiment "Prince Leopold", 24 July 1878
 Appointment as Chief of the Royal Prussian 2 Lower Silesian Infantry Regiment No. 47, 8 August 1878

Notes

References

Attribution:

External links 

 

1815 births
1881 deaths
Military personnel from Darmstadt
Bavarian generals
Barons of Germany
People from the Kingdom of Bavaria
Burials at the Alter Nordfriedhof (Munich)
Grand Crosses of the Military Order of Max Joseph
Grand Crosses of the Military Merit Order (Bavaria)
Recipients of the Military Merit Cross (Mecklenburg-Schwerin), 1st class
Recipients of the Pour le Mérite (military class)
Recipients of the Iron Cross (1870), 1st class
Recipients of the Order of the Medjidie, 2nd class
Recipients of the Order of the White Eagle (Russia)
Recipients of the Order of St. Anna, 1st class
Recipients of the Order of Saint Stanislaus (Russian), 1st class
Commanders Grand Cross of the Order of the Sword